Please Heat This Eventually is a 12" EP from Gold Standard Laboratories and is a collaboration between Omar Rodríguez-López Group and Damo Suzuki of the group Can. It features both live performance of the group (then named Omar Rodriguez-Lopez Quintet) with Suzuki in Cologne, Germany on November 14, 2005, and studio recorded elements arranged together into one extended piece. The EP consists of a single 25-minute track split up over both sides of the record. Parts 1, 2, and 3 appear on side 1 and parts 4, 5, and 6 appear on side 2. It was released commercially on January 23, 2007 on vinyl, though GSL pre-orders began shipping in December 2006.

A shorter, instrumental version of the song (recorded live in Kortrijk, Belgium) appears on Se Dice Bisonte, No Búfalo, while the full EP with Damo's vocals appears as a bonus CD on the Japanese edition of the same album.  A single track version of 24:49 is now available via Omar's digital store.

Cover design is by Sonny Kay, who continued to have artistic involvement in many of Omar's records.

Track listing

Personnel 
Damo Suzuki – vocals
Omar Rodríguez-López – guitars
Juan Alderete – bass
Money Mark – keyboards
Adrián Terrazas-González – saxophone, bass clarinet, flute, percussion
Marcel Rodríguez-López – drums
Jon Debaun - recording engineer

References

2007 EPs
Omar Rodríguez-López albums